Horace Eldred "Danny" Dill (September 19, 1924 – October 23, 2008) was an American country music singer and songwriter. He was inducted into the Nashville Songwriters Hall of Fame in 1975.

Biography
Dill, born in Clarksburg, Tennessee, got his start as a professional musician while working with Annie Lou Stockard as Annie Lou and Danny, a duet act who performed on the Grand Ole Opry during the 1940s and 50s. Annie Lou And Danny Dill were made members of The Opry in the 1940s.  Although Dill recorded as a solo artist, he found his greatest success as a songwriter.

His 1959 tune, "Long Black Veil", written with Marijohn Wilkin, was Top 10 country hit for Lefty Frizzell and has become a standard recorded by many country, folk and pop music musicians.  Another notable Dill composition was "Detroit City (I Wanna Go Home)", that was a hit for Bobby Bare, Tom Jones and Dean Martin.

Selected compositions
 "I'm Hungry for your lovin"
"Long Black Veil"
"Detroit City" (with Mel Tillis)
 "Partners" (recorded by Jim Reeves in 1959)
 "So Wrong" with Carl Perkins and Mel Tillis
 "The Comeback"
 "Let Me Talk to You"
 " There's A Time"
 "I'll Take It Before I Say Goodbye"
 "Coming Home"
 "Partners"
 "Come In Outta' The Rain"
 "Where The Sad People Are"

References

External links
 Danny Dill at the Nashville Songwriters Hall of Fame
 Danny Dill MP3s
 Danny Dill discography
Danny Dill's son-in-law's memorial

1924 births
2008 deaths
People from Huntingdon, Tennessee
American country singer-songwriters
American male singer-songwriters
Cub Records artists
Grand Ole Opry members
20th-century American singers
Singer-songwriters from Tennessee
People from Carroll County, Tennessee
Country musicians from Tennessee
20th-century American male singers